The Bavarian dynasty was those kings of the Lombards who were descended from Garibald I, the Agilolfing duke of Bavaria. They came to rule the Lombards through Garibald's daughter Theodelinda, who married the Lombard king Authari in 588. The Bavarians were really a branch of the Agilolfings, and were themselves two branches: the branch descended in the female line through Garibald's eldest child and daughter, Theodelinda, and the branch descended from Garibald's eldest son Gundoald. Of the first branch, only Adaloald, Theodelinda's son by her second husband, whom she had chosen to be king, Agilulf, reigned, though her son-in-law Arioald (married to her daughter Gundeberga) also ruled. Through Gundoald, six kings reigned in succession, broken only by the usurper Grimuald, who married Gundoald's granddaughter:

Aripert I (653–661), son of Gundoald
Godepert (661–662), eldest son of previous, jointly with
Perctarit (661–662; 672–688), second son of Aripert I, jointly with above until 662
Cunipert (688–700), son of previous
Liutpert (700–701), son of previous
Raginpert (701), son of Godepert
Aripert II (701–712), son of previous
The Basilica of Santissimo Salvatore, commissioned in Pavia by Aripert I in 657, became the mausoleum of the Bavarian dynasty.

References

Sources
Oman, Charles. The Dark Ages, 476–918. London: Rivingtons, 1914.

 
Lombard families